Denis Mustafaraj (born 2 April 1986) is an Albanian retired footballer who played as a midfielder for KF Laçi in the Albanian Superliga.

External links
 
 
 Profile - FSHF

1985 births
Living people
Albanian footballers
Association football midfielders
KF Laçi players
Kategoria Superiore players